The Wax Model is a lost 1917 American drama silent film directed by E. Mason Hopper and written by Julia Crawford Ivers. The film stars Vivian Martin, Thomas Holding, George Fisher, Helen Jerome Eddy, Clarissa Selwynne and Katherine Vaughn. The film was released on February 1, 1917, by Paramount Pictures.

Plot

Cast 
Vivian Martin as Mulie Davenant
Thomas Holding as Melville Ilchester
George Fisher as John Ramsey
Helen Jerome Eddy as Helen Ilchester
Clarissa Selwynne as Julie's Mother 
Katherine Vaughn as Mrs. Ramsey
Pietro Buzzi as Hermineux
Marion Sievers as Julie's Mother

References

External links 
 

1917 films
1910s English-language films
Silent American drama films
1917 drama films
Paramount Pictures films
Films directed by E. Mason Hopper
American black-and-white films
American silent feature films
Lost American films
1917 lost films
Lost drama films
1910s American films